The Vault is an unmanned self-serve coffee shop, bakery, book store and center for the arts located in Valley City, North Dakota. In June 2014 The Vault received international attention for its unique business model.

History

The Vault was the result of a three and a half year renovation project of a former bank building in Valley City, North Dakota. The bank was originally built in 1920 as The Bank of Valley City, later it became Farmer's and Merchant Bank, and was later abandoned. The building was purchased in 2000 by Paul Stenshoel, and the main room of the lower level gifted to David Brekke in 2009 for use as a coffee shop and community center.

Honor System

The Vault has no employees or price scanners. Customers take products and pay via credit card, check or cash on the honor system. There are cameras but their main purpose is intended to be to provide a safe atmosphere. The food and drink are priced, but the books are priced as patrons see fit. In the interview by Boerner, Brekke said that customers have been "15% more honest, than thieving."

Media coverage

On June 20, 2014 Aaron Boerner of KVRR Fargo covered story on The Vault focusing on its unique business model. On June 23 the story was aired by CNN nationally. On the morning of June 24 the story was aired on TV stations across the United States, leading to a subsequent interview by NY Daily News.

References

External links
. Official site of The Vault.
. The KVRR video as aired on CNN.
. Video of The Vault being discussed on Good Morning Connecticut.
. Video of The Vault being discussed on Abilene Today.
. Article by NY Daily News.

Companies based in North Dakota
Coffeehouses and cafés in the United States